Carry On Nurse is a 1959 British comedy film, the second in the series of 31 Carry On films (1958–1992). Of the regular team, it featured Joan Sims (in her Carry On film debut), Kenneth Williams, Kenneth Connor and Charles Hawtrey, with Hattie Jacques and Leslie Phillips. The film was written by Norman Hudis based on the play Ring for Catty by Patrick Cargill and Jack Beale. It was the top-grossing film of 1959 in the United Kingdom and, with an audience of 10.4 million, had the highest cinema viewing of any of the "Carry On" films. Perhaps surprisingly, it was also highly successful in the United States, where it was reported that it played at some cinemas for three years.

Plot 
The journalist Ted York (Terence Longdon) is rushed to Haven Hospital with appendicitis. The ambulance gets there at top speed, but only because the driver wants to know the result of a horse race. Ted is given a bed and is instantly smitten with Nurse Denton (Shirley Eaton). The other nurses are incessantly having to respond to the calls of the Colonel (Wilfrid Hyde-White), who has a private room. He is an inveterate gambler and is having his bets placed by Mick (Harry Locke), the orderly.

That evening, the boxer Bernie Bishop (Kenneth Connor) is admitted after hurting his hand at the end of a bout. The next day, the Sister (Joan Hickson) galvanises the nurses, orderly and patients for the inspection by Matron (Hattie Jacques). As usual, she is let down by Nurse Dawson (Joan Sims), a clumsy student nurse. Matron checks on the progress of the patients, and speaks to Mr Hinton (Charles Hawtrey), who is forever listening to the radio with his headphones. Mick and the Colonel bet on how long the Matron will take on her rounds.

Ted is visited by his editor and agrees to write a series of articles on his hospital experiences. He realises that Nurse Denton is in love with a doctor, but that her interest is not returned. Bernie is told that he will not be able to box for several months at least. Nurse Dawson is sent to ring the bell to signal the end of visiting hours, but she calls for the fire brigade by mistake.

The bookish intellectual Oliver Reckitt (Kenneth Williams) is visited by Jill (Jill Ireland), the sister of his friend Harry. They clearly like each other, but are too shy to admit it. Bernie urges Oliver to admit how he really feels about her. Bernie's manager Ginger (Michael Medwin) comes to visit him and tells him that he must try to be more of a showman and not simply go for broke with every match. Nurse Dawson comes in early to sterilise some rubber catheters, but is interrupted by the demanding Colonel. The catheters are put in a kidney dish to boil on the stove. Oliver is furious when the ward has to be cleared and tidied up for Matron's rounds as it upsets his schedule for no obvious purpose. When she arrives everyone begins to smell the forgotten catheters, which by now are burning on the stove. When Matron stops to speak to Oliver, he complains about the disruptive effects that her visits have on the patients. Matron is furious and has the Sister make all the beds again.

Jack Bell (Leslie Phillips) arrives to have a bunion removed and is placed on the ward. Jill comes to see Oliver and they admit that they care for each other. She gives him a bar of nougat as a gift, but later that evening it makes him sick. Mr Able complains that he can not sleep as he has been missing his wife. He is put on medication, but it makes him wildly excited and he runs amok in the hospital. Eventually Bernie subdues him with a left hook to the jaw.

Bell's operation is delayed, which upsets him greatly as he is planning a romantic weekend. He offers the men in the ward the champagne he was going to drink with his girlfriend. They all get drunk and decide to remove the bunion themselves. The night nurse is tied up and Hinton pretends to be her while the others go to the operating theatre. Jack starts to panic as Oliver prepares to operate, but soon they are all giggling as the laughing gas has been left on. The nurse arrives before any real damage is done.

The colonel plays a trick on Nurse Dawson and pins a piece of paper with a large red 'L' on her back. Ted learns that Nurse Denton is applying for a job in America and tries to dissuade her. Jack catches a cold and is told that his operation will have to be postponed yet again. Oliver is discharged and leaves with Jill. Bernie is met by his young son and they leave together. Ted is also discharged and makes a date with Nurse Denton. Nurse Dawson and Nurse Axwell decide to get even with the Colonel and replace a rectal thermometer with a daffodil. Luckily for them, upon her inspection, Matron manages to see the funny side.

Cast

Shirley Eaton as Staff Nurse Dorothy Denton
Kenneth Connor as Bernie Bishop
Kenneth Williams as Oliver Reckitt
Charles Hawtrey as Humphrey Hinton
Hattie Jacques as Matron
Terence Longdon as Ted York
Bill Owen as Percy Hickson
Leslie Phillips as Jack Bell
Cyril Chamberlain as Bert Able
Brian Oulton as Henry Bray
Joan Sims as Student Nurse Stella Dawson
Susan Stephen as Nurse Georgie Axwell
Wilfrid Hyde-White as the Colonel
Harry Locke as Mick the Orderly
Joan Hickson as Sister
Ann Firbank as Staff Nurse Helen Lloyd
Susan Beaumont as Nurse Frances James
Marita Stanton as Nurse Rose Harper
Rosalind Knight as Student Nurse Nightingale
Susan Shaw as Mrs Jane Bishop
Jill Ireland as Jill Thompson
Irene Handl as Mrs Marge Hickson
June Whitfield as Meg
Marianne Stone as Mrs Alice Able
Hilda Fenemore as Mrs Rhoda Bray
Ed Devereaux as Alec Lawrence
Norman Rossington as Norm
Michael Medwin as Ginger
Martin Boddey as Perkins
Leigh Madison as Doctor Winn
John Van Eyssen as Mr Stephens, the surgeon
Bernard Bresslaw (uncredited): his feet were used as stand-ins for Terence Longdon's, when the latter's character was supposedly standing in a bath.

Production

The film was made from 3 November to 12 December 1958 with filming at Pinewood Studios in Buckinghamshire.

Release
The film premiered in London at the Carlton Cinema on 5 March 1959 before going on general release nationwide from 23 March 1959.

Reception
The film was the most popular at the British box office in 1959 grossing $843,000. It was the most successful Carry On film with an estimated ten million admissions. It made over $2 million in theatrical rentals in the US.

A positive review in Variety called it "the second in what should be a golden series. It does for hospital what its predecessor did for military life ... It is an unabashed assault on the patrons' funnybones. The yocks come thick and fast." A negative review in The Monthly Film Bulletin of the UK stated: "A somewhat stale farce, mixing slapstick, caricature and crudely anatomical humour, puts life in a public hospital ward into the same cheerlessly rollicking category as the barrack-room." Bosley Crowther of The New York Times wrote, "All they do is run through their routines – and hackneyed routines they are, tending mostly toward roughhouse antics and intimate hospital gags. The script by Norman Hudis is pure Roquefort, the direction of Gerald Thomas is vaudeville-timed. Yet this film has been a vast success in Britain ... don't ask us why." Richard L. Coe of The Washington Post wrote that "being so frankly Lowbrow, 'Carry On Nurse' also should appeal to Highbrows who, as Russell Lynes' Law states, have much in common with the Lowbrows. Middle Brows should stay away and let the rest of us wallow."

References

Bibliography

Keeping the British End Up: Four Decades of Saucy Cinema by Simon Sheridan (third edition) (2007) (Reynolds & Hearn Books)

External links
 
Carry On Nurse Location Guide at The Whippit Inn
Carry on Nurse at BFI Screenonline

1959 films
Nurse
British black-and-white films
1950s English-language films
Works about nursing
Films directed by Gerald Thomas
Films set in hospitals
1959 comedy films
Films shot at Pinewood Studios
Films produced by Peter Rogers
Films with screenplays by Norman Hudis
British films based on plays
1950s British films